Suleiman Al-Fortia ( born march 1954) is a member of the Libyan National Transitional Council representing the city of Misrata. Fortia received his undergraduate degree from the University of Tripoli and a Doctor of Engineering in architecture from a British university. He has taught at King Faisal University for eight years. He has participated in delegations to France during talks where the anti-Gaddafi forces asked for weapons shipments. He also negotiated in person for aid efforts to help Misrata during the siege of Misrata.

References

Living people
1954 births
Members of the National Transitional Council
Libyan engineers
Engineering academics
Misrata
Libyan educators
University of Tripoli alumni
Academic staff of King Faisal University